Grand Ayatollah Sayyid Abbas Hosseini Kashani (1931 – July 18, 2010) was an Iranian Twelver Shi'a Marja.

He has studied in seminaries of Najaf, Iraq under Grand Ayatollah Abu al-Qasim al-Khoei and Muhsin al-Hakim.

See also
List of Maraji
List of deceased Maraji

Notes

External links
Biography in Persian
His ideas about Grand Ayatollah Mohammad-Taqi Bahjat Foumani

Iranian grand ayatollahs
Iranian Islamists
Shia Islamists
1931 births
2010 deaths
Burials at Fatima Masumeh Shrine